Reinado Internacional del Café 2015 was held in Manizales, Colombia, on January 10, 2015. At the end of the event, the outgoing queen Priscilla Durand Reina Internacional del Café 2014 from Brazil crowned Yuri Uchida of Japan as his successor.

Results

Special awards

Contestants

Crossovers
Contestants who previously competed or will compete at other beauty pageants:

Miss World:
2016:  – Jéssica Melania González Monge 
2015:  – Stefanía de Jesús Alemán

Miss Earth:
2014:  – Eloísa Gutiérrez

Miss International:
2014:  – Katharina Rodin
2014:  – Kesiah Papsasin
2014:  – Claudia Herrera

Miss Grand International:
2014:  – Karla Bovet

Miss Intercontinental:
2011:  – Maritza León 
2012:  – Kesiah Papsasin 
2014:  – Isabel Soloaga

Reina Hispanoamericana:
2014:  – Leslye Santos Vargas (Best Hair)

Miss Continente Americano:
2012:  – Kesiah Papsasin (Miss Congeniality)

Miss Italia nel Mondo:
2011:  – Vitória Machado Bisognin

Miss Global Internacional:
2014:  – Sade Nataly Colebrook

Reina Internacional del Arroz:
2014:  – María Fernanda Badaracco (3rd runner-up)

Reina Internacional del Joropo:
2014:  – María Fernanda Badaracco

Miss Trifino:
2013:  – Stefanía de Jesús Alemán

Notes

Returns
Last competed in 1992:
 

Last competed in 2006:
 

Last competed in 2011:
 

Last competed in 2012:
 

Last competed in 2013:

Withdraws

Replacements
 : María José Alvarado died in November 2014 was replaced by Paola Sarras.

References

External links
 Instituto de Cultura y Turismo de Manizales
 Alcaldía de Manizales
 Feria de Manizales

2015
2015 beauty pageants
2015 in Colombia
January 2015 events in South America